Bauskas alus is a brewery in Bauska, Latvia.

It was established in 1981, at the time as a part of a local kolkhoz canning factory. At first the brewery produced traditional beers such as Marta alus (Märzen), Rīgas alus (Beer of Riga) and Senču alus (Ancestors' Beer). In 1982 the brewery started producing their main articles Bauskas gaišais (Bauska Light) and Bauskas tumšais (Bauska Dark).

See also 
 Užavas Alus

References

Beer in Latvia
Beer brands
Latvian brands
Bauska
Companies established in 1981